The Tansy beetle (Chrysolina graminis) is a species of leaf beetle. The common name derives from its main foodplant, Tansy (Tanacetum vulgare), but it can also use other wetland plants such as Gypsywort (Lycopus europaeus) and Water Mint (Mentha aquatica). It measures 7.7–10.5 mm in length and has a characteristic bright metallic green colouration, with pitted elytra and a coppery tinge. In addition to the nominotypical subspecies, which repeats the specific name, C. graminis graminis, there are five further distinct subspecies of Tansy beetle, which, collectively, have a Palearctic distribution, although in the majority of countries where it is found the species is declining. In the United Kingdom it is designated as 'Nationally Rare'. The UK's stronghold population is located along the banks of the river Ouse in York, North Yorkshire, . Other, small fenland populations exist at Woodwalton Fen and at Welney Wildfowl and Wetlands Trust (WWT) reserve.

Taxonomy
The Tansy beetle was first described by Carl Linnaeus in his landmark 1758 10th edition of Systema Naturae as Chrysomela graminis and was later transferred to the genus Chrysolina. The genus Chrysolina currently contains 39 subgenera. C. graminis (with its several subspecies) is located in the subgenus Euchrysolina which contains only one other species – C. virgata; this subgenus was first established in 1950.

Its specific name graminis is a form of the Latin noun gramen, meaning "of grass" or "grass-like". Chrysolina graminis sensu lato has at least three later binomial names which are considered to be synonyms: Chrysomela fulgida Fabricius, 1801, Chrysolina nigrocuprea Mallet, 1924, and Chrysolina taupini Mallet, 1924.

There are six subspecies of Tansy beetle. The nominotypical subspecies C. graminis graminis was established via the original description of the species in 1758. C. graminis santonici (named after the Italian name, Santonico, for its host plant Artemisia caerulescens) was described by N. B. Contarini in 1847. In 1860 Victor Motschulsky described two subspecies – C. graminis artemisiae and C. graminis auraria. These were added to in the 20th century with C. graminis christianae (Mallet, 1933) and C. graminis mediterranea Bechyné, 1950.

The subspecies of C. graminis have localised distributions: C. graminis artemisiae is located in south-east Europe, central Asia, and southern Siberia; C. graminis auraria is located in Dauria, eastern Mongolia, and China; C. graminis christianae is located in France; C. graminis mediterranea is located in Corsica and Spain; C. graminis santonici is located in the central Alps.

Description
Tansy beetles are small, rounded beetles approximately 7–12 mm in length. There are both internal and external morphological differences between the six subspecies.

Larvae
The larvae of C. graminis have four instar stages, though the first instar may not possess the characteristics of the later instars. Larvae are brown, and dorsally convex with spiracles evident on eight segments. They usually have small, indistinct tubercles with very short setae. The head of each larva is a darker brown than the body and has six ocelli on each side. The mandibles have five apical teeth.

Distinguishing Chrysolina graminis and Chrysolina herbacea

Chrysolina graminis and the mint beetle C. herbacea are similar in size and colour and may be confused in UK populations. Distinguishing the two species in the United Kingdom is particularly important as C. graminis is a vulnerable species, whereas C. herbacea is much more common. This has previously led to the misidentification of C. herbacea as C. graminis. C. herbacea measures 7–11 mm in length. It is coloured iridescent green on dorsal surface throughout. The punctuation on the pronotum and elytra is distinctly similar, unlike in C. graminis. There is a smooth lip running only half the length of the ventral edge of the elytra, whereas this lip runs the full length on C. graminis.

Distribution and habitat
The Tansy beetle has a Palearctic distribution. Evidence from archaeological excavation has shown that its presence in western Europe is confirmed at least as early as the Neolithic period. The beetles are found feeding on Tansy (Tanacetum vulgare), water mint (Mentha aquatica) or gypsywort (Lycopus europaeus) in fenland or the banks of rivers with broad floodplains in Britain. Larvae are also recorded from other host plants: Achillea ptarmica (sneezewort) in France and various plants of the genus Artemisia in Russia. Adults and larvae feed on the leaves of their host plants.

Distribution
In continental Europe, C. graminis is widespread from Scandinavia to the Mediterranean Sea. It may also be found in central Asia and China. In Russia it may be found in the tundra zone from the Polar Urals to the Kolyma River, and in the nearby countries of Kazakhstan, and Mongolia. It is listed as vulnerable in Austria, Denmark, Sweden and Norway, and in Germany it is rare in one district, endangered in another.

United Kingdom
In the United Kingdom, its range is currently restricted to about 45 km of the banks of the River Ouse centred on York, North Yorkshire. Although the population fluctuates widely, the York population is by far the largest. The beetle is part of the landscape of traditionally managed floodplain grasslands (Ings) in York. Even though the Tansy beetle is characteristic of the riparian margins of meadows, rather than the grasslands themselves, it is still a quintessentially ‘Ings’ species. It is likely that the practice of hay making, followed by aftermath grazing favoured the survival of Tansy beetles. Removing livestock during the spring/summer facilitates breeding and larval development, while autumn grazing helped suppress more competitive vegetation on the riparian fringe. This system of land use probably dates back to Roman times around York, was established extensively during the Saxon period and covered a large proportion of the Ouse floodplain until relatively recently. This historical land-use legacy is probably one of the reasons that the Ouse corridor is the Tansy beetle’s remaining stronghold. 

Along the River Ouse, the beetle is mainly found living in clumps of Tansy, which provide their staple food source. This localised distribution of foodplant means the beetle population is split up into smaller sub-populations.These sub-populations are more-or-less isolated from one another as the beetle very rarely flies. Flight has only been witnessed on one or two occasions, most recently at Wicken Fen in 2014 (during an attempted reintroduction). Large gaps in food-plant distributions threaten the long-term future of the beetles’ meta-populations.

In the East Anglian Fens beetles have been recorded feeding on Water Mint (Mentha aquatica), Gypsywort (Lycopus europaeus), Marsh Woundwort (Stachys palustris) and Hempnettles (Galeopsis), with Tansy being completely absent. Tansy beetles had previously been recorded from Wicken Fen, Cambridgeshire but the last accurate record for the beetle at this site was in 1981. In August 2014, a new sighting was made nearby at Woodwalton Fen, following a 40-year absence of records. In 2018, the beetles were also discovered at the Wildfowl and Wetlands Trust (WWT) reserve at Welney, west Norfolk. 

Due to the reduced density of beetles at these two more southern sites, much of the information on the biology of the species has been gleaned from the York population. However, there is evidence that beetles present in Yorkshire and East Anglia may represent different ecotypes with differing biologies. It seems likely that the Tansy beetle populations in the Fens and on the Ouse have been separated for a very long time and may have evolved adaptive differences in behaviour and the ability to metabolise different food plants. For example, beetles at Woodwalton may overwinter in soil at a shallower depth compared with those along the Ouse as they are not exposed to potential soil erosion during winter flooding.  

Likewise, feeding beetles from the Ouse population over a number of generations solely on Water Mint has been shown to severely reduce their reproductive output; similar but less extreme effects are seen when they are fed a diet of Gypsywort. Increased research into potential evolved behavioural and physiological differences between these beetle populations is important if we are to understand the conservation needs of the two populations.  

Surveying efforts focussed along the Ouse dates back to 1998, with comprehensive monitoring of the entire beetle range occurring annually since 2009. The survey is completed by The Tansy Beetle Action Group (TBAG), where trained volunteers survey a stretch of the river for foodplant and beetle distribution/abundance between August and September.  

Overall, the beetles and Tansy plant range along the Ouse has remained relatively stable, although there has been some annual variation in the range of the beetle along the river, often as a result of finding, or not finding, a single individual. However, the proportion of Tansy plants clumps occupied by beetles has varied; for example, falling from 19% to 13.2% between 2011 and 2012. Previously, range contraction has been particularly evident on the east bank south of York and west bank north of York. However, the 2020 survey indicated that the beetles range limits contracted on all margins excluding the east bank at the southern edge of the range, which is unsurprising given this sub-population is now confined to cattle-proof enclosures. Probable reasons for range contractions include prolonged overgrazing by sheep/cattle and regular flooding events.

As of 2006, there were 19 British hectads (10 km squares) with records of the Tansy beetle, but it has only been seen in 11 of these since 1970, six of which are centred around York. In 2015, the total number of individuals estimated from a survey of this area on the banks of the River Ouse was 24,000. In 2016, the population peaked, estimated at 40,000 beetles, an increase of 63% on the previous year. The estimated beetle population size has fluctuated significantly in the years since. Results from the 2020 survey indicate a 49.45% reduction in the estimated beetle population size from the previous year to only 11,500. Spring and summer flooding is likely to be a major contributor to this decline, however, flooding is not sole factor affecting local population sizes. Other factors believed to have contributed to beetle population declines include increased grazing pressure on Tansy and competition from other plant species such as extensive willow (Salix spp.) growth and Himalayan Balsam. Following unforeseen disruption from the COVID-19 pandemic, substantial changes were also made to the surveyor team which may have resulted in inconsistencies in survey figures since.  

Despite general declines in 2020, notable increases were detected at some transects which could indicate a shift to more favourable conditions in these areas. Some of these increases can be attributed to improved land management practices resulting in a greater presence of Tansy at critical times in the beetle’s life cycle.

Threats to habitat
Historically the Tansy beetle may have been more widespread in Britain and it is not clear what factors have led to its decline, especially in the East Anglian Fens. The beetle’s food plants – Tansy, Water Mint and Gypsywort – are widespread across the British Isles although, as intimated above, local quantity and distribution are both critical for the long-term survival of beetle populations. The decline in C. graminis is likely to be due to habitat loss resulting from land improvement and arable conversion, development, drainage, lowering of water-tables due to over-abstraction, improper land management and accidental removal when mistaken for Ragwort (Jacobaea vulgaris). Neglect may also lead to loss or degradation of habitat such as through over-shading or competition of food plants with invasive species such as Himalayan balsam (Impatiens glandulifera).

Within the York distribution the beetles are dependent on Tansy as their sole food source; if a clump disappears the beetles are forced to walk to a new location as they rarely fly, despite having fully working wings and being capable of doing so. As beetles can only walk 150-200m between foodplant clumps, sub-populations can easily become isolated and vulnerable to local extinctions. The loss of habitat impacts upon the ability of the Tansy beetle to find an alternative source of the host plant. Additionally, tansy is a ruderal species and thus has a naturally high rate of turnover of plants, forcing beetles to regularly seek out new Tansy patches to colonise. 

Eutrophication is likely to be another significant threat as it leads to the decline of Tansy and the replacement of heterogeneous vegetation mosaics with highly competitive nitrophilous plant communities. There is a general increase in nutrient loading in the Ouse floodplain as historic botanical data indicates the loss of many smaller, poorly competitive plants during the past 100 years. 

Flooding can eliminate large sub-populations; evidence suggests that summer flooding has the greatest impact. With only one known stronghold population in Britain, it would take just one year of extreme summer flooding to jeopardise the whole population along the River Ouse. During summer floods, larvae sink and drown when knocked off plants and eggs also die after a few days inundation. Adults do not seem to suffer as much mortality, as they either float away (buoyed by air trapped under their elytra), climb to higher ground or even enter the soil by climbing down submerged stems.

Life cycle

Both adults and larvae use the same host plant during their life cycle. As Tansy often grows in discrete clumps, the total population of C. graminis in an area may be divided and individuals may spend their entire life cycle within an area of a few square metres.

Adults mate between March and June. In the monitored populations at York, mating of the same pair could last over 24 hours, during which time some pairs moved between Tansy patches.  Mating in a Russian population of C. graminis is preceded by an elaborate ritual not evident in other populations of the species, involving the male tapping the female's eyes, pronotum and antennae with its antennae. Mated females lay numerous batches of 3–15 elongated, yellow eggs (each 2 mm long) on the underside of the Tansy leaves.  In captivity, one newly mated female produced 561 eggs over 136 days suggesting a capacity for rapid population growth. However, this number is likely to be greatly reduced in reality, where conditions will be far from ideal captive environments. Females will lay in several locations and will cannibalise the eggs of other females. For this reason, high beetle density on Tansy plants induces some females to seek out other, non-food plants on which to lay their eggs, however, this can increase larval mortality while they locate Tansy to commence feeding.

After hatching, the newly emerged, grey larvae pass through four instars before burrowing into the soil at the base of the Tansy clump during July. In laboratory conditions, newly hatched larvae have been shown to survive for at least four days without food and thus have a long window of opportunity in which to reach a Tansy plant. Very little is known about the biology of the final instar larvae burrowing to pupate. Although this is certainly the case for beetles of the York population, it is likely there is some disparity in the overwintering behaviour of fenland populations. They too manage to survive winter flooding, perhaps by overwintering near or above ground level.

Between August and September, this new adult population emerges to feed before returning underground to overwinter in October; emergence of adults is from March to April the next year. Long-term monitoring has indicated that survival during winter hibernation is surprisingly high, as autumn and spring population sizes are very similar. This is despite annual winter flooding of the River Ouse, implying that overwintering individuals must be extremely tolerant of long periods of inundation and oxygen deprivation. Approximately 5% of overwintering adults do not emerge from the soil after the winter, but remain underground for the next year in a state of extended diapause and emerge in the following spring.

Most of the previous generation’s adults die before the new generation emerges. Both adult and larval tansy beetles are unable to detect their host plant, or each other, at a distance, either by smell, sight or a combination of the two. Starvation is thus likely to be a major contributor to mortality when beetles wander away from their host and become lost.

Behaviour and ecology

Diet
Tansy beetles are herbivorous and primarily use tansy (Tanacetum vulgare) as their host plant. The species has, however, also been recorded consuming a wider range of food plants including Lycopus europaeus (gipsywort), Stachys palustris (marsh woundwort), Achillea ptarmica (sneezewort), Mentha aquatica (water mint), Mentha rotundifolia (false apple mint), as well as other species of the genera Chrysanthemum, Scutellaria, and Artemisia. The subspecies C. graminis santonico is associated with Artemisa caerulescens.

The tansy plant naturally contains a number of volatile components including 1,8-cineole, trans-thujone, camphor and myrtenol, with the quantities and proportions of each varying seasonally and from plant to plant. 1,8-cineole is a toxin believed to defend the plant leaves against attacks by herbivores. The tansy beetle is resistant to these chemicals. However, tansy is a repellent to other Chrysomelid beetles. For example, the steam distillate of fresh leaves and flowers of tansy contains high levels of camphor and umbellulone and is strongly repellent to the Colorado potato beetle (Leptinotarsa decemlineata).

Predation

Beetle remains bearing what appeared to be the marks of bird attacks have been found by the River Ouse and hardened adults often bear symmetrically indented elytra, interpreted as 'pinch marks' inflicted by a beak whilst newly emerged adults are still hardening. Dead beetles have also been found in the webs of spiders in a captive population. The accidental predation of C. graminis by livestock consuming the tansy plant is also possible. Predation of a larva by the scorpionfly Panorpa germanica has been observed in the field. The tachinid genus Macquartia exclusively parasitizes Chrysolmelid beetles and one species of which, Macquartia dispar, may parasitise C. graminis directly. The adult fly deposits fully incubated eggs or newly hatched larvae into the vicinity of the host larvae.

Larvae of other Chrysomelids are predated by birds, coccinellids, predatory bugs, lacewing larvae, syrphid larvae, carabids, ants, wasps, spiders and harvestmen, all of which are common on the tansy around the York population. The pupal stage may be directly predated by the European mole.

Parasites
A mite, Chrysomelobia mahunkai (family Podapolipidae) has been recorded from a single adult specimen of C. graminis, and Eulophus chrysomela (a species of hymenopteran of the family Eulophidae) is recorded as an endoparasite of the pupal stage.

Relationship with humans

Conservation in the United Kingdom

The species is formally designated as 'Nationally Rare' in the United Kingdom and categorised as a 'Species of Principal Importance' in accordance with the Natural Environment and Rural Communities Act 2006 and in 2014 it was classified as Endangered in the UK Red List review.The Tansy Beetle Action Group (TBAG) was set up in 2008 to initiate and oversee conservation efforts and comprises representatives from the Species Recovery Trust, University of York, North Yorkshire County Council, City of York Council, Environment Agency, National Trust, Askham Bryan College, BIAZA, Buglife, Leeds City Council, Natural England, York St John University, The Deep, Yorkshire Wildlife Trust, Canal and Rivers Trust, York Museums Trust, Carstairs Trust and Bugtopia amongst other organisations and parish councils. A recovery programme started, involving annual surveys of both Tansy and beetles, control of tree shading and invasive plants and limited re-introductions within the current species range. New clumps of Tansy have been planted, particularly between isolated existing patches which may be beyond the 200m walking range of the beetle. 

There are a small number of ark sites that have been established to provide secure populations of beetles close to the Ouse but unaffected by summer flooding. In addition, sites have been set up specifically for educational/outreach purposes. As a result there are small sub-populations of beetles Askham Bryan College, York (x2), on the Selby Canal (Canal and Rivers Trust) and in the York Museum Gardens (York Museums Trust).The colony at Selby canal has continued to expand and now has beetle numbers of over 1,000, being the main insurance population (Oxford, 2021).  

From 2019 onwards TBAG working with the Species Recovery Trust has been working with landowners to provide advice and support to facilitate land management on the Ouse riverbanks, including holding a land manager workshop in 2020. Other advice so far has included training EA staff supporting targeted mowing on flood banks and improvements to the enclosures.   

TBAG, with additional funding from SITA Landfill Grant, has also built a series of 11 cattle-proof enclosures close to the riverbank near Riccall, south of York. These are spaced in walking distance for the beetle, acting as stepping-stones for beetle populations. In 2012, captive-bred beetles were introduced to a single enclosure. By 2019, only two of the enclosures remain unoccupied evidencing their ability to disperse successfully despite harsh conditions imposed by cattle between enclosures.

Beningbrough Hall is another site with Tansy beetle presence along the Ouse. Years ago Tansy clumps were planted in the orchard area, with visions of establishing another ‘educational population’. In 2019, flooding along the river resulted in the many of the plants becoming submerged, many of which occupied by beetles. 32 individuals were rescued and transferred to Tansy in the orchard. In 2020, beetles were observed in the orchard throughout the summer and in 2022 it was used as an outreach feature at events within the gardens.

The Tansy Beetle Champions Project 2015-16 was set up by Buglife in conjunction with TBAG and with HLF support. Rachael Maskell, the Member of Parliament for the constituency of York Central became a 'Tansy Beetle Species Champion' in 2016. This project seeks to encourage members of the public to engage with conservation efforts, support monitoring and restoration work and learn more about the beetle and how they can help in the long term. This has happened through local talks, presence at public events and promotion via media attention. The project also enabled the employment of two Tansy Beetle Conservation Officers for an 18- month period, which coordinated initiatives to remove Himalayan Balsam, plant Tansy and visit primary schools to engage the younger generation. These roles have now been taken on by volunteers. 

In October 2019 a large mural of a tansy beetle was painted on the side of a house in Queen Street, York by street artist ATM.

References

External links

cycle/ Tansy beetle life cycle in images
Photographic comparison of tansy beetle and mint beetle
Distribution map showing range of tansy beetle on the River Ouse, North Yorkshire in 2009
Video of mating tansy beetles
List of published resources on Chrysolina graminis at Biodiversity Heritage Library

Chrysomelinae
Beetles of Asia
Beetles of Europe
Species endangered by habitat loss
Taxa named by Carl Linnaeus
Beetles described in 1758